JL Skinner III (born April 16, 2001) is an American football safety for the Boise State Broncos.

Early life
Skinner was born on April 16, 2001, in San Diego, California. He later attended Point Loma High School.

College career
Skinner played in all 14 of Boise State's games during his freshman season. He started all six of the team's games in a COVID-19-shortened 2020 season and had 37 tackles with one interception. Skinner was named second team All-Mountain West Conference after finishing the season with 92 tackles, seven tackles for loss, two interceptions, three passes defended, and two forced fumbles. He considered entering the 2022 NFL Draft, but opted to return to Boise State for his senior season.

References

External links
Boise State Broncos bio

Living people
Boise State Broncos football players
Players of American football from California
American football safeties
2001 births